South Karnataka generally refers to the southern part of Karnataka state, excluding the coastal areas. It generally corresponds to former Mysore state. Kannada dialect of South Karnataka is slightly different as compared to North Karnataka.

Districts
There are 15 districts in South Karnataka:

 Bengaluru Urban
 Bengaluru Rural
 Chikkaballapur
 Kolar
 Mysuru
 Mandya
 Kodagu
 Hassan
 Chikmagalur
 Shivamogga
 Tumakuru
 Chitradurga
 Davanagere
 Chamarajanagar
 Ramanagara

See also 
 Bangalore Division
 Bayalu Seeme
 North Karnataka
 Coastal Karnataka

References

Regions of Karnataka